Henry Newman is a British political adviser. He is an adviser to Michael Gove, having formerly been a senior adviser to Prime Minister Boris Johnson. He also served as a councillor on Camden London Borough Council.

Early life
Newman's grandmothers were an Istanbul-born Greek, and a German Jew who fled the Nazis, before training as a doctor at the Royal Free Hospital.

Newman was an undergraduate at Christ Church, Oxford. He later studied at Harvard University and the London School of Economics.

Career
Newman taught politics and history at various universities, including politics at SOAS University of London, before working in Whitehall under Prime Minister David Cameron during the Conservative–Liberal Democrat coalition. He worked on Government efficiency and prison reform and was promoted through various roles as a special adviser. Newman worked for Francis Maude at the Cabinet Office. He joined Michael Gove at the Ministry of Justice in 2015. Newman was a special adviser to Gove, and was reported to have been a protégé of Gove. Newman worked on the Vote Leave campaign in the run-up to the 2016 EU referendum. He was said to have helped convince Gove to withdraw his support for Boris Johnson during the 2016 Conservative Party leadership election and run himself. Under Prime Minister Theresa May, he joined and was director of the think tank Open Europe, being seen as an influential supporter of May's Brexit plan.

In the 2018 Camden Council election, Newman was elected as a Conservative candidate in Frognal and Fitzjohns ward.

Following the election of Johnson as Prime Minister, Newman worked for Gove at the Cabinet Office. In November 2020, Newman was falsely accused of erasing his mobile phone call log during an investigation into a COVID-19 lockdown leak. He was the target of a campaign designed to put him under suspicion of leaking Government plans for a second COVID-19 lockdown to newspapers. In April 2021, Dominic Cummings alleged he had been told by the cabinet secretary that Newman was likely to have been the leaker in October 2020, when he was an adviser at the Cabinet Office. Cummings alleged that the prime minister had been told that "all the evidence" pointed to Newman, whom Cummings described as a "chatty rat". Newman denied the accusation.

Newman worked as a senior adviser to Johnson, after being considered to be elevated to the role by Johnson's wife Carrie. In October 2021, it was reported by the Camden New Journal that Newman had told colleagues of his intention to depart Camden Council.

In January 2022 it was alleged that Newman had visited Carrie in the flat above 11 Downing Street when COVID-19 rules were in place. On 7 February 2022, after a "mutually agreed decision" with Johnson, he left his role at 10 Downing Street to become an adviser to Gove at the Department for Levelling Up, Housing and Communities. Johnson had been urged to move Newman away from his role over accusations—strongly denied by Number 10—that Carrie was influencing Johnson's appointments and Government policy.

Newman did not contest the 2022 Camden Council election.

Personal life
Newman's partner is academic Guglielmo Verdirame, Baron Verdirame. The couple live in Hampstead, London.

References

Living people
British political consultants
British special advisers
Councillors in the London Borough of Camden
Conservative Party (UK) councillors
Gay politicians
English LGBT politicians
Alumni of Christ Church, Oxford
Harvard University alumni
Alumni of the London School of Economics
Year of birth missing (living people)